S. B. Khanthan is a Tamil film director of movie Jerry. He also directed several stage plays, advertisements and documentaries.

Career

Khanthan is a Chartered Accountant by qualification, senior executive in a consumer durable conglomerate by experience and a creative director by profession.
He is the son of noted Harikatha exponent Thiruvidaimarudur Sambamoorthi Ganapaadigal Balakrishna Sastrigal and was introduced to the world of fine arts at a very young age and to the nuances of film making (from conception till delivering the reels to theater) through his brother, director & Actor T. S. B. K. Moulee.

Khanthan was introduced to humour through decades of association with friend and humourist, Shri Crazy Mohan and to basics of Visual Communication through cinematographer, P. C. Sreeram.

Filmography

 Jerry (2006)

Media world
Through his firm Studio Dream, Khanthan conceives, produces and directs advertisements, corporate films and documentaries.

Notable among them are
 TamilNadu – Vision 2025 for Confederation of Indian Industries
 Retailer film for Coca-Cola
 Motivational films for AREVA, Hindustan Latex Ltd and HDFC Bank
 Corporate film for Quality Inn Sabari Group of Hotels
 Centenary film for Delloite (Fraser and Ross) (Chartered Accountants)
 Safety film for Chennai Petroleum Corporation Ltd.
 Corporate Film for Bayer
 Project films for Swaraj-Isuzu, AREL Software Parks
 Documentaries for CLRI

Musical documentaries
 GNB - The Music Charmer – An insight into the musical legend GNB on his birth centenary
 Mridanga Chintamanihi – The Magnum Opus of the Percussion Legend Umayalpuram Sri Sivaraman
 We Bow To You, Sir!, A short film on the Violin Maestro Shri Lalgudi G.Jayaraman, screened on the occasion of the Life Time Achievement Award conferred on him by Music Academy.
 The Musicians’ Musician - An 80-minute musical film on Shri. Ramnad Krishnan, the carnatic music legend
 Sunaadha Vinodhan, an 85 minutes documentary on Tanjore S. Kalyanaraman, another carnatic music legend
 Pada Varnams of Lalgudi G Jayaraman

Valuable social works
 Poongaatru Pudhithaanathu, a short film on Asthma Cure
 Endhakuzhandhaiyum Nalla Kuzhandhaithaan, an Educational film for proper upbringing of children for Mr N C Sridharan, Educationist
 Gift of Time – on Time Management
 Mind To Serve – on How Artificial Limbs make movement impaired come back to normal life

Advertisement films
Khanthan has also directed advertisements for popular products like
 Dukes Biscuits
 Bhandari Interstate Carriers
 Pentasoft
 Elac Water Heaters

Stage plays
Khanthan is the Founder-Director of Crazy Creations. He directs and provides music choreography for all the plays staged by Crazy Mohan totaling to over 4500 shows in India, USA, Sri Lanka, Indonesia, Singapore, Kuwait and Hong Kong.

Electronic media
 Directed first serial in 1986-87 in DD1 titled Here is Crazy - 13 Weeks. Went on to direct all the TV serials written by the humorist Shri Crazy Mohan
 Maadhu-Cheenu - 7 Weeks in DD Metro, Singapore and Malaysian TVs; Now retelecast and topped the ratings in Vijay TV. Bestowed with Best Director award by Mylapore Academy for this serial
 Nil Gavani Crazy - 66 Weeks in Sun TV and Jaya TV
 Si-Ri-Ga-Ma-Pa-Da-Ni - 106 Weeks in Raj TV and Jaya TV (A unique concept of blending humor with film songs)
 Oru Babyin Diary - 16 Weeks in DD1 and Malaysian TV
 Pathukku Pathu - 42 Weeks in DD, National-Tamil
 Crazy Times - 85 weeks in Star Vijay TV
 Vidaathu Sirippu –75 Weeks in Jaya TV
 Siri Siri Crazy – 15 Weeks in Kalaignar TV

Telefilms
Khanthan has also directed the following telefilms written by Crazy Mohan.
 Ganapathikku Kalyanam - DD1
 Ganesanukku Kaalkattu - DD1
 Sirippu Thirai - Sun TV
 Computer Kaadal - Raj TV

DVD
Khanthan was also responsible for converting the following successful stage plays to DVD formats to cater to the needs of the international audience.
 Maadhu Plus Two - In DVD format for US Viewers
 Marriage Made In Saloon - in DVD format for US Viewers
 POURNAMI - Director K Balachander’s stage play in DVD format
 ORU KOODAI PAASAM – Director K Balachander’s stage play in DVD format

Animation film
Khanthan co-directed the first-ever 3D Animation film produced in India titled Paanadavaas the 5 Warriors meant for Hollywood and American kids.

Miscellaneous
Khanthan directed a telefilm written by director Mouli titled Naan Ready Nee Readiya which was telecast in Star Vijay TV. He followed it up by writing and directing a serial for Sun TV produced by director Vasanth titled Charu-Latha which ran successfully for 40 weeks. The natural tale involving two lovely female kids was well received by the audience.

References

External links
 S.B.Khanthan's Official Website

Tamil film directors
Indian advertising directors
Tamil screenwriters
Tamil dramatists and playwrights
Living people
Indian theatre directors
Year of birth missing (living people)